Zhou Ying (born 23 December 1988) is a Chinese table tennis player and gold medalist of Paralympic Games. She won the gold medals of the class 4 of women's individual table tennis at the 2008 Summer Paralympics, and the same class table tennis at the 2012 Summer Paralympics.

Like many of her teammates, Zhou had had polio, was from Pizhou and had attended New Hope Center as a child. That's where coach Heng Xin developed her into a star.

References

1988 births
Chinese female table tennis players
Table tennis players at the 2008 Summer Paralympics
Table tennis players at the 2012 Summer Paralympics
Table tennis players at the 2016 Summer Paralympics
Paralympic table tennis players of China
Medalists at the 2008 Summer Paralympics
Medalists at the 2012 Summer Paralympics
Medalists at the 2016 Summer Paralympics
Paralympic medalists in table tennis
Paralympic gold medalists for China
Living people
Para table tennis players from Pizhou
People with polio
Table tennis players at the 2020 Summer Paralympics
FESPIC Games competitors